Per Joar Hansen (born 17 August 1965) is a Norwegian football coach. He grew up in the small community of Trofors in Nordland. He played for and managed Rosenborg BK, and he has managed GIF Sundsvall, Aalesunds FK, Ranheim and the Norwegian under-21 football team.

Club career
Known by the nickname "Perry", he began his career in the lower flight clubs of Mosjøen IL and Steinkjer FK, before enjoying a brief spell at Rosenborg from 1987 to 1989. He contributed to Rosenborg winning The Double in 1988. He then went on to play in lower divisions for Umeå FC, Stjørdals-Blink, Strindheim IL (first tier in 1995), Byåsen IL, Fram Skatval, and actually serving as player-manager from 1995 in Strindheim, Byåsen and Varden.

Managerial career
From the late 1990s "Perry" first joined the coaching staff of Rosenborg, but went on to Swedish top flight club GIF Sundsvall in the autumn of 2001 where he enjoyed great success in his first season.

After just avoiding relegation in 2003, he resigned from the club and returned to Rosenborg, turning down the job as manager of Swedish champions Djurgården of Stockholm.  He was assistant manager to Ola By Rise during the not too impressive 2004 season, and he was appointed manager going into the historic start of the Royal League, which was not a successful competition of Scandinavian football.

Considered by the press as only the third best man for the position, he led Rosenborg into a difficult reconstruction process, seeing the stem of the team closing in on retirement from professional football. Halfway into the 2005 season, he resigned after a string of bad results, and was immediately replaced by Per-Mathias Høgmo.

Hansen signed a two-year contract with the Adeccoligaen club Aalesunds FK on 6 December 2006. Aalesunds got promoted to Tippeligaen the following year. He left Aalesunds and returned to GIF Sundsvall in December 2007. He was the manager there until 2 October 2008, when he got fired. From the 2009 season, he coached Ranheim Fotball in the Adeccoligaen. During the 2010 season, he was head of a coaching team including Otto Ulseth and Christer Basma.

He began 2011 managing the Norway national under-21 football team. On 16 October 2012, the team qualified for the UEFA European Under-21 Championship with an astonishing 5–4 aggregate win over France. His assistant manager Tor Ole Skullerud led the team to the semi-finals, as he returned to Rosenborg for his second spell as manager of the club.

In September 2021, Hansen was hired by Swedish club Östersunds FK. He left it at the end of the year, as the club only gained 5 points in 13 games under his helm and was relegated from the top-tier Allsvenskan.

Managerial statistics

References

1965 births
Living people
Norwegian footballers
Steinkjer FK players
Rosenborg BK players
Strindheim IL players
Ranheim Fotball players
Byåsen Toppfotball players
Umeå FC players
Norwegian football managers
Rosenborg BK managers
GIF Sundsvall managers
Aalesunds FK managers
Ranheim Fotball managers
Norwegian expatriate footballers
Expatriate footballers in Sweden
Norwegian expatriate football managers
Expatriate football managers in Sweden
Norwegian expatriate sportspeople in Sweden
Association football midfielders
IL Stjørdals-Blink players
Östersunds FK managers
People from Namsos
Allsvenskan managers
Eliteserien managers
Sportspeople from Trøndelag